Tonight for Sure is a 1962 softcore comedy film directed by Francis Ford Coppola. It was the re-edited version of a nudie film named The Wide Open Spaces directed by Jerry Schafer. Jack Hill was the director of photography. The music was composed by Carmine Coppola. This is a film set in August 1961, on the Sunset Strip, and in the El Rey Casino in Searchlight, Nevada. The movie stars Karl Schanzer and Don Kenney and featuring female co stars Marli Renfro, Virginia Gorden, Electra, Exotica, Laura Cornell, Karla Lee, and Sue Martin.

The film features footage from The Peeper (a short sexploitation film by Coppola) and an unfinished Western set in a nudist colony.

Plot
On the Sunset Strip, two unlikely men rendezvous: Samuel Hill, an unkempt desert miner, and Benjamin Jabowski, a John Birch Society dandy from the city. Intent on some sort of mayhem, they enter the Herald Club before the burlesque show starts, and they wire something to the electrical box, set to blow at midnight. They sit at the back of the club to get to know each other. As they drink and glance at the stage, Sam tells of a partner driven mad by visions of naked women in the sagebrush; Ben tells a tale of trying to rid his neighborhood of a pin-up studio. As they get drunker and the clock ticks toward midnight, they pull their chairs closer to the women on stage.

See also
 List of American films of 1962
 The Party at Kitty and Stud's, the debut of Sylvester Stallone
 Sugar Cookies, a film produced by Oliver Stone
 Caligula, with Malcolm McDowell, Peter O'Toole, John Gielgud and Helen Mirren
 Abel Ferrara, former pornographic film director
 Jerry Stahl, former pornographic screenwriter

External links
 
 
 

1962 films
1960s Western (genre) comedy films
1960s pornographic films
American pornographic films
American Western (genre) comedy films
Films directed by Francis Ford Coppola
Films produced by Francis Ford Coppola
Films set in California
American sexploitation films
Films with screenplays by Francis Ford Coppola
Films scored by Carmine Coppola
1962 comedy films
1960s English-language films
1960s American films